Chrysopsis highlandsensis, called the Highlands goldenaster,  is a North American species of flowering plant in the aster family. It has been found only in three counties in central Florida: Highlands, Polk, and Glades.

Chrysopsis highlandsensis is a perennial herb up to 110 cm (44 inches) tall. It very often produces several stems, each bearing many leaves and as many as 50 yellow flower heads. The species grows in sandy pine woods and wooded scrubland.

References

External links
Archbold Biological Station, Chrysopsis highlandsensis Species Account
Encyclopedia of Life
photo of herbarium specimen at Missouri Botanical Garden, type specimen of Chrysopsis highlandsensis

highlandsensis
Endemic flora of Florida
Highlands County, Florida
Plants described in 2002